Mesiotelus is a genus of spiders in the family Liocranidae. It was first described in 1897 by Eugène Simon.

Species
 it contains sixteen species:
Mesiotelus caucasicus Zamani & Marusik, 2021 – Armenia, Azerbaijan, Iran
Mesiotelus cyprius Kulczyński, 1908 – Crete, Cyprus
Mesiotelus deltshevi Naumova, 2020 – Albania
Mesiotelus grancanariensis Wunderlich, 1992 – Portugal, Canary Is., Madeira
Mesiotelus kulczynskii Charitonov, 1946 – Central Asia
Mesiotelus libanicus (Simon, 1878) – Lebanon
Mesiotelus lubricus (Simon, 1880) – China
Mesiotelus maderianus Kulczyński, 1899 – Madeira
Mesiotelus mauritanicus Simon, 1909 – Mediterranean
Mesiotelus patricki Zamani & Marusik, 2021 – Iran
Mesiotelus pococki Caporiacco, 1949 – Kenya
Mesiotelus scopensis Drensky, 1935 – North Macedonia, Bulgaria, Greece, Turkey, Iran
Mesiotelus tenellus (Thorell, 1875) – Italy
Mesiotelus tenuissimus (L. Koch, 1866) – Europe, North Africa, Turkmenistan
Mesiotelus viridis (L. Koch, 1867) – Greece (incl. Crete)
Mesiotelus zonsteini Mikhailov, 1986 – Central Asia

References

Liocranidae
Araneomorphae genera
Spiders of Asia
Spiders of Africa